Borg Bastion is a prominent summit,  high, on Johns Hopkins Ridge, standing  northwest of Mount Rucker in the Royal Society Range, Victoria Land. It was named by the Advisory Committee on Antarctic Names in 1994 after Scott G. Borg, a geologist who conducted field investigations in Antarctica, 1978–1994; from 1992 he was Program Manager for Polar Earth Sciences, Office of Polar Programs, National Science Foundation.

References 

Mountains of Victoria Land
Scott Coast